Trizeuxis is a monotypic genus of flowering plants from the orchid family, Orchidaceae. The sole species is Trizeuxis falcata, native to the American Tropics (Trinidad, Venezuela, Colombia, the Guianas, Costa Rica, Panama, Brazil, Ecuador, Peru and Bolivia).

See also 
 List of Orchidaceae genera

References

External links 

IOSPE orchid photos, Trizeuxis falcata Lindl. 1823 Photo courtesy of Dale and Deni Borders 
Projeto Orchidstudium, Trizeuxis falcata

Monotypic Epidendroideae genera
Oncidiinae genera
Oncidiinae
Orchids of South America
Orchids of Central America
Flora of Trinidad and Tobago